The fifth season of the Case Closed anime was directed by Kenji Kodama (until episode 118) and Yasuichiro Yamamoto (since episode 119) and produced by TMS Entertainment and Yomiuri Telecasting Corporation. The series is based on Gosho Aoyama's Case Closed manga series. In Japan, the series is titled  but was changed due to legal issues with the title Detective Conan. The episodes' plot continues Jimmy Kudo's life as a young child named Conan Edogawa and introduces the character Ai Haibara/Vi Graythorn.

The episodes use five pieces of theme music: two opening themes and three closing themes. The first Japanese opening theme  by Zard until episode 123. The second opening theme is "Truth (A Great Detective of Love)" by Two-Mix for the rest of the season. The third ending theme is "Still for Your Love" by Rumania Montevideo for the rest of the season. The English adaption of season five opening theme was "Spinning the Roulette of Destiny" up until episode 130, and no further dubbed episodes have been released. The English adaptions ending themes were "Negai Goto Hitotsu Dake" until episode 114 and followed by "Kōri no ue ni Tatsu yō ni" until episode 130.

The season initially ran from June 29, 1998 through February 8, 1999 on Nippon Television Network System in Japan. Episodes 107 to 134 were later collected into eight DVD compilations by Shogakukan that were released on March 24, 2006. The season was later licensed and dubbed by FUNimation Entertainment and released in a DVD box set containing episodes one hundred-six to one hundred thirty, one hundred to one twenty-three in the Japanese numbering. The Viridian edition of the season was released on March 23, 2010.


Episode listing

Notes

 The episode's numbering as used in Japan
 The episode's numbering as used by Funimation Entertainment
 The episodes were aired as a single two-hour long episode in Japan

References

1998 Japanese television seasons
1999 Japanese television seasons
Season 5